Omar Hajjami (born 31 July 1990) is a Moroccan taekwondo practitioner. He competed in the 58 kg division at the 2016 Summer Olympics, but was eliminated in the second bout.

References

External links

1990 births
Living people
Moroccan male taekwondo practitioners
Olympic taekwondo practitioners of Morocco
Taekwondo practitioners at the 2016 Summer Olympics
20th-century Moroccan people
21st-century Moroccan people